Thirsty Land (Spanish:Tierra sedienta) is a 1945 Spanish drama film directed by Rafael Gil.

The film's sets were designed by Pierre Schild.

Cast
 Irene Caba Alba 
 Ana María Campoy 
 Ángel de Andrés 
 Mary Delgado 
 Juan Domenech
 Félix Fernández 
 Casimiro Hurtado 
 José Jaspe 
 José María Lado
 Luis Martínez 
 Manuel París 
 Nicolás D. Perchicot 
 Julio Peña 
 José Portes 
 José Prada 
 Jacinto Quincoces 
 Fernando Rey 
 Santiago Rivero 
 Joaquín Roa 
 Alberto Romea

References

Bibliography
 de España, Rafael. Directory of Spanish and Portuguese film-makers and films. Greenwood Press, 1994.

External links 

1945 films
1945 drama films
Spanish drama films
1940s Spanish-language films
Films directed by Rafael Gil
Films scored by Juan Quintero Muñoz
Spanish black-and-white films
1940s Spanish films